Abu Taltal is a village in al-Bab District in northern Aleppo Governorate, northwestern Syria.

References 

Populated places in al-Bab District